Skateball is a video game developed by Ubi Soft. It features a violent futuristic sports game part ice skating, part soccer. It was released in 1989 for the Amstrad CPC and GX4000, Atari ST, Commodore 64 and ZX Spectrum. 

In 1990, Ubi Soft re-issued the game with a new title: Skate Wars. This title was also used by Ocean Software for the 1992 budget release on their Hit Squad label.

Gameplay 
A Skateball match is played by two teams on an ice court with steel walls and ball. There are several different courts with holes and other lethal obstacles. The game lacks any rules and any kind of contact is allowed.

The game can be played by one or two players. Each team has three players, one of them a goalkeeper. The object of the game is to score five goals or kill the three players of the opposite team.

References

External links 
 Skateball at games.db.com
 
 

1989 video games
1990 video games
Amiga games
Atari ST games
ZX Spectrum games
Commodore 64 games
Amstrad CPC games
Amstrad GX4000 games
Fantasy sports video games
Ubisoft games
Europe-exclusive video games
Video games developed in France